Lo Schiavo is a surname.

 John Lo Schiavo
 Linda Ann Lo Schiavo

It may also refer to:

 Lo schiavo, Carlos Gomes